Marco Antonio López Escobar (born 20 March 1995) is a Mexican footballer who plays as a left-back for Universidad de Guadalajara on loan from C.D. Guadalajara.

References

External links
 
 

1995 births
Living people
Mexican footballers
Association football defenders
Irapuato F.C. footballers
Leones Negros UdeG footballers
Ascenso MX players
Liga Premier de México players
Tercera División de México players
Footballers from Guanajuato
People from Guanajuato City